Reli, or Relli, is a language spoken primarily by the Reli people of Eastern and Southern India closely related to, and possibly a dialect of Odia.

References

Eastern Indo-Aryan languages
Languages of Odisha
Odia language